Victor Châteauvert (12 March 1841 – 6 November 1920) was a Canadian politician. He married Virginie Dussault. He was associated  to Gaspard Lemoine (married to Emma Renaud) in the company J.B. Renaud in Quebec city.

He was the unsuccessful Conservative candidate in the 1891 federal election for the riding of Quebec-Centre. He was elected to the Legislative Assembly of Quebec for the identically-named provincial riding of Québec-Centre in the 1892 Quebec election. A Conservative,  he was defeated in 1897. He was also defeated in the 1900 federal election. He 1902 he was member of the board of the Auditorium de Québec (now le Capitole de Québec)with  S.Napoléon Parent (mayor), William Price, John Sharples, H. M. Price, Goerges Tanguay and Georges Thompson. 
He is the father of Alexandre Châteauvert, who became vice-president of J. B.  Renaud after the death of his father. He is also the father of Victor Châteauvert, Jr. He was the grandfather of both Jean-Richard Châteauvert (son of Alexandre Châteauvert) and Françoise Châteauvert (daughter of Victor Châteauvert and Flore Derouin), one of whose grandsons is Jean-Nicolas De Surmont. Françoise Châteauvert was a close friend of Yvonne Lemoine, granddaughter of Gaspard Lemoine and the family of Jean Senecal, Guy Des Rivières, Gilles Lamontagne and Jean Lesage. Françoise Châteauvert used also to do horse-riding with Gilles Turcot in the 1930s.

References
 
De Surmont, Jean Nicolas, "Qui se souvient des Châteauvert", Le Soleil, Québec, février 2020 : https://www.lesoleil.com/opinions/point-de-vue/qui-se-souvient-des-chateauvert--89ba5b5882511bbb88f08bd2a640c005

External links
 

1841 births
1920 deaths
Conservative Party of Canada (1867–1942) candidates for the Canadian House of Commons
Conservative Party of Quebec MNAs
Politicians from Quebec City